Sharp's Hill Quarry is a  geological Site of Special Scientific Interest west of Banbury in Oxfordshire. It is a Geological Conservation Review site.

This is the type locality of the Sharp's Hill Formation. It is very fossiliferous and dates to the Bathonian stage of the Middle Jurassic, around 167 million years ago. It is very important for understanding the Bathonian succession in north Oxfordshire. Strata of the underlying Chipping  Norton  Formation are also present.

References

Sites of Special Scientific Interest in Oxfordshire
Geological Conservation Review sites